Addis Neger was an Ethiopian daily news website published in Maryland, USA, for a worldwide Ethiopian audience. It is the largest metropolitan website available for the Ethiopian diaspora. Founded on August 4, 2006, the site was rated the number one Ethiopian news web site in 2008. However, it is not connected to the popular Addis Neger private newspaper in Ethiopia.

The original Addis Neger news outlet was founded in 2005 by two political science students in Ethiopia. After the government arrested one of the students, the other fled to the U.S. and established the website in 2006 in order to publicize the political and social situation in Ethiopia. The names of the members are purposely kept hidden until the imprisoned student is released.

External links
Addis Neger website

2006 establishments in Maryland
African culture in Maryland
African journalism
American news websites
Communications in Maryland
Ethiopian-American history
Society of Ethiopia